Ascent Capital Group, Inc. is a public holding company whose primary subsidiary is Monitronics. Ascent Media was a wholly owned subsidiary of the Discovery Holding Company (DHC). DHC spun off Ascent Media as an independent, public company on September 17, 2008.

The company's main activity through its wholly owned subsidiary, Monitroincs,  is to provide security alarm monitoring services to more than 1 million residential and commercial customers in the United States, Canada and Puerto Rico through its nationwide network of independent dealers.

History
In its past, Ascent Capital Group provided creative and technical services to the media and entertainment industries. Ascent Media was a wholly owned subsidiary of the Discovery Holding Company (DHC). DHC spun off Ascent Media as an independent, public company on September 17, 2008.

The assets and operations of Ascent Capital Group are composed primarily of the assets and operations of various businesses acquired from 2000 through 2004, including The Todd-AO Corporation, Four Media Company, Video Services Corporation, Group W Network Services, London Playout Centre and the systems integration business of Sony Electronics. The combination and integration of these and other acquired entities allows AMG to offer integrated outsourcing for the technical and creative requirements of its clients, from content creation and other post-production services to media management and transmission of the final product to broadcast television stations, cable system head-ends and other destinations and distribution points."

 1999: Ascent Media formed through the acquisition of three post-production companies: Todd-AO Corporation, Four Media Company, and certain assets of Soundelux Entertainment Group using Liberty Media stock valued at more than $400 million US dollars.
 2005: Ascent Media announces deal with Sony Pictures Entertainment to convert Sony's library of more than 4,000 films and many of its vintage TV shows into digital files. "As envisioned by Sony and Ascent Media, files that are now delivered manually to distributors such as the Starz Encore pay-TV service would be transferred instead as digital files over a secure network."
 2006: Discovery Holding Company acquires AccentHealth to be overseen by Ascent Media.  Discovery Holding's press release reported, "Delivered to over 11,200 medical waiting rooms nationwide, AccentHealth's programming and sponsor messages are delivered to over 19 million health conscious consumers each month."
2007: During the fourth quarter of 2007, the Board of Directors of DHC approved a resolution to spin off the capital stock of AMC to the holders of DHC Series A and Series B common stock. Each owner of Series A common stock is allowed 1 vote per share of voting power and Series B common stock owners are allowed 10 votes per share.
2008: On September 4, 2008, Ascent Media completed the sale of 100% of the ownership interests in AccentHealth to an unaffiliated third party for net cash proceeds of $118,643,000.
2008: The AMC Spin Off was completed on September 17, 2008.  Following the AMC Spin Off, AMC and DHC operate independently, and neither has any stock ownership, beneficial or otherwise, in the other.
2008: Ascent Media Group's Creative Sound Services group spun off from Discovery Holding Company to create CSS Studios, LLC, a wholly owned subsidiary of Discovery Communications. This included the assets of Todd-AO, Soundelux, Sound One, POP Sound, Modern Music, Soundelux Design Music Group and The Hollywood Edge.
2010: In December 2010, Ascent Media acquired Monitronics, a home security system company.
2011: On February 28, 2011, Encompass Digital Media, Inc. purchased Ascent Media's global content distribution business, including facilities in: New York metro area, Minnesota, Burbank, London and Singapore.  On July 7, 2011, Ascent Media Corporation merged with its subsidiary, Ascent Capital Group, Inc., for the purpose of changing its name to Ascent Capital Group, Inc.
2012: On October 26, 2012, Monitronics acquired approximately 93,000 security alarm monitoring subscriber accounts representing $4.4 million of gross recurring monthly revenue from Pinnacle Security for a purchase price of $131 million.

References

External links

Film production companies of the United States
Companies formerly listed on the Nasdaq
Corporate spin-offs